Clepsis crinis is a species of moth of the family Tortricidae. It is found in the Mexican states of Nuevo León and Hidalgo.

References

Moths described in 1979
Clepsis